The Border Police (Macedonian: Гранична полиција) is a legal police unit that monitors and protects the borders of North Macedonia.

Vehicles
1 Bus Mercedes
2 Minibuses Mercedes Sprinter 
23 Cross-motorcycles Husqvarna   
17 Ford Focus  
8 Ford Transit 
62 Jeeps Land Rover Defender  
2 Jeeps Land Rover Freelander

Attacks

See also
Ministry of Internal Affairs
Police of North Macedonia
Lake Patrol
Army of North Macedonia
Lions former
Special Operations Unit - Tigers
Alpha (Police Unit)
Special Support Unit

References

Specialist law enforcement agencies of North Macedonia